Operation Cerberus may refer to:

Channel Dash, a German naval mission codenamed Operation Cerberus
Operation Cerebus (1985), during the South African Border War